5 is the debut studio album from British R&B musical group Sault. The album has been met with positive critical reception.

Critical reception
The editorial staff of AllMusic Guide gave 5 four out of five stars, designating it the "Best of 2019", with reviewer Andy Kellman noting that "the highlights are numerous, equal in quantity to the approaches". In The Guardian, Alexis Petridis  reviewed both 5 and 7, giving them each five stars out of five, writing that  both are "fantastic, walking an idiosyncratic path that zig-zags between ESG-esque post-punk funk, early 80s boogie and something approaching neo-soul, without ever really fitting into any of those categories or sounding like straightforward homage".

Citing their first two albums, Paste declared Sault one of the 15 new British bands that audiences should listen to in 2020.

Track listing
"Up All Night" (Dean Josiah Cover and Cloepatra Nikolic)– 4:16
"Don’t Waste My Time" (Cover and Melisa Young)– 3:15
"Foot on Necks" (Cover and Nikolic)– 3:12
"Why Why Why Why Why" (Cover and Nikolic)– 3:59
"Pink Sands" (Cover)– 1:52
"Let Me Go" (Cover and Nikolic)– 3:13
"Masterpiece" (Cover and Nikolic)– 5:45
"Add a Little Bit of SAULT" (Young)– 0:18
"Something’s in the Air" (Cover and Young)– 3:10
"Think About It" (Cover and Young)– 2:48
"Wild Hundreds, Pt. 5" (Cover)– 0:51
"We Are the Sun" (Cover)– 3:56
"Wild Hundreds, Pt. 55" (Cover and Nikolic)– 1:28
"B.A.B.E" (Cover and Nikolic)– 3:45

Chart performance
"Let Me Go" spent one week no the Billboard Mexico Ingles Airplay chart at number 49.

Personnel
Sault
Kadeem Clarke
Dean Josiah "Inflo" Cover
Cleopatra "Cleo Sol" Nikolic
Melisa "Kid Sister" Young

Technical personnel
Tom Campbell– production

References

External links

Review aggregate by Album of the Year
Review from Album Reviews blog

2019 debut albums
Sault (band) albums
Self-released albums
Albums produced by Inflo